Steinfeld railway station may refer to 
Steinfeld (Oldb) railway station
Steinfeld (Pfalz) railway station
Steinfeld (Stendal) railway station